Rudolf Muradovich Muradyan (born 19 June 1936 in Yerevan, Armenia) is an Armenian theoretical physicist who has done work in elementary particle physics, mathematical physics, and cosmology. He is the recipient of the 1988 Lenin Prize, along with Albert Tavkhelidze and Viktor Matveev, for the discovery of dimensional quark counting rules.

References

1936 births
Living people
Armenian physicists
Theoretical physicists
Soviet physicists